Theresa Healey (born 25 January 1964) is a New Zealand actress, known mostly for her role as nurse Carmen Roberts in the New Zealand soap opera Shortland Street.

Early life
Theresa was born on 25 January 1964 and is of Irish Catholic descent. As a child, Healey went to a mixture of schools, state and Catholic, including Sacred Heart College in Hamilton. She has three siblings: Susan, Mark and Anthony. She graduated from Toi Whakaari: New Zealand Drama School in 1985 with a Diploma in Acting, and afterwards moved back to Auckland.

Career
Healey has been a guest on the New Zealand version the television series of Dancing With The Stars and starred  as Alison Smart in the New Zealand comedy/drama television series Go Girls. She has also had regular recurring roles on the New Zealand television series Mercy Peak and the television series Xena: Warrior Princess.

Filmography

Film

Television

Personal life

Healey has two children, Zachary and Xavier, and currently resides in central Auckland, New Zealand.

External links

References

Living people
New Zealand film actresses
New Zealand television actresses
New Zealand soap opera actresses
1964 births
20th-century New Zealand actresses
21st-century New Zealand actresses

Toi Whakaari alumni